The 1990 World Junior Championships in Athletics was the 1990 edition of the World Junior Championships in Athletics. It was held in Plovdiv, Bulgaria on 8–12 August.

Results

Men

Women

Medal table

Participation
According to an unofficial count through an unofficial result list, 987 athletes from 86 countries participated in the event.  The number of athletes is in agreement, but there is one country less than the official number of 87 as published.

See also
1990 in athletics (track and field)

References

External links
Medalists at GBRathletics.com
Results
 Official results

 
1990
World Junior Championships in Athletics
World Junior Championships in Athletics
International athletics competitions hosted by Bulgaria
Sport in Plovdiv